Moala Graham-Taufa (born 22 February 2002) is a professional rugby league footballer who plays as a er for the New Zealand Warriors in the NRL.

He previously played for the Sydney Roosters in the National Rugby League.

Background
Graham-Taufa came through the Sydney Roosters junior systems, playing for their Harold Matthews and SG Ball teams, debuting for the Roosters NSW cup feeder side, the North Sydney Bears. In 5 games Graham-Taufa scored 4 tries in NSW Cup before the competition was cancelled due to COVID lockdown in Sydney. In Round 24 2021, Graham-Taufa made his NRL debut for the Roosters against the South Sydney Rabbitohs at Suncorp Stadium in a 54-12 loss. Graham-Taufa came on as an 18th man inclusion after Joey Manu was taken off due to a Latrell Mitchell hit.

During the 2022 season, Graham-Taufa was released by the Roosters, subsequently signing with the Parramatta Eels.

Graham-Taufa signed with the New Zealand Warriors on a train and trial deal for the 2023 season.

References

External links
 NSW Cup profile

Sydney Roosters players
North Sydney Bears NSW Cup players
Rugby league wingers
Living people
2002 births